Stojadin Mirković (Serbian Cyrillic: Стојадин Мирковић; 14 January 1972 – 29 September 1991) was a Yugoslav People's Army conscript who fought in the war in Croatia. He became known on a wide scale after it was discovered that he died along with Maj. Milan Tepić in the Battle of the Barracks.

Awards/Recognitions 
 Medal of merit in the field of defense and security, first level (FR Yugoslavia). In 2018, one street in Belgrade was named after Stojadin Mirković.

References

External links
 Valjevac vaspitan da pogine za otadžbinu
 Zaboravljeni junak sa Povlena

1972 births
1991 deaths
Military personnel from Valjevo
Serbian soldiers
Yugoslav People's Army personnel
Military personnel of the Croatian War of Independence
Military personnel killed in the Croatian War of Independence
Yugoslav military personnel killed in action
Recipients of the Order of St. Sava